Chandbibi (চাঁদবিবি) is a Hindu goddess and folk deity in Bengal, worshipped in conjunction with the goddesses Oladevi (the goddess of Cholera), Ajgaibibi, Jholabibi, Bahadabibi, Jhetunebibi and Asanbibi. 

Experts and researches believe that these seven deities are transmogrifications of Vedic deities. Their collective worship is evidenced in prehistoric times by a terracotta relic found at Mohenjo-daro, a major city of the Indus Valley civilisation located in Sindh, which shows the image of seven women standing together.

Notes

Culture of West Bengal
Hinduism in Bangladesh
Islam in Bangladesh
Regional Hindu goddesses
Hindu folk deities